The 50th parallel south is a circle of latitude that is 50 degrees south of the Earth's equatorial plane. It crosses the Atlantic Ocean, the Indian Ocean, the Pacific Ocean and South America.

At this latitude the sun is visible for 16 hours, 22 minutes during the December solstice and 8 hours, 4 minutes during the June solstice. On December 21, the sun is at 63.83 degrees in the sky and on June 21, the sun is at 16.17 degrees in the sky. During the summer solstice, nighttime does not get beyond astronomical twilight, a condition which lasts throughout the month of December. Everyday of the month of November can view both astronomical dawn and dusk.

The maximum altitude of the Sun is > 25.00º in April and > 18.00º in May.

Around the world
Starting at the Prime Meridian and heading eastwards, the parallel 50° south passes through:

{| class="wikitable plainrowheaders"
! scope="col" width="125" | Co-ordinates
! scope="col" | Country, territory or ocean
! scope="col" | Notes
|-
| style="background:#b0e0e6;" | 
! scope="row" style="background:#b0e0e6;" | Atlantic Ocean
| style="background:#b0e0e6;" |
|-
| style="background:#b0e0e6;" | 
! scope="row" style="background:#b0e0e6;" | Indian Ocean
| style="background:#b0e0e6;" | Passing just south of the Kerguelen Islands, 
|-
| style="background:#b0e0e6;" | 
! scope="row" style="background:#b0e0e6;" | Pacific Ocean
| style="background:#b0e0e6;" | Passing just south of the Antipodes Islands, 
|-
| 
! scope="row" | 
| Patagonic Archipelago and mainland, Magallanes Region
|-
| 
! scope="row" | 
| Santa Cruz Province
|-
| style="background:#b0e0e6;" | 
! scope="row" style="background:#b0e0e6;" | Atlantic Ocean
| style="background:#b0e0e6;" |
|}

See also
49th parallel south
51st parallel south

s50